Ronald Bishop may refer to:

 Ron Bishop (1943–2014), American off-road motorcycle racer
 Ronald Bishop (archer) (born 1931), British Olympic archer 
 Ronald Eric Bishop (1903–1989), British aircraft designer